Madura Island (Indonesian: Pulau Madura, Madurese: Polo Madhurâ; [pɔlɔʰ ˈmadʰurɐʰ], Pèghu: ڤولو مادْوراْ‎, Carakan: ꦥꦺꦴꦭꦺꦴꦩꦢꦸꦫ, Lontara': ᨄᨘᨒᨚ ᨆᨉᨘᨑ) is an Indonesian island off the northeastern coast of Java. Administratively, Madura is part of the province of East Java. It is separated from Java by the narrow Madura Strait. The administered area has a density of 748 people per km2 while main island has a somewhat higher figure of 826 per km2 in 2020.

Etymology 

The name of Madura island is of Hindu origin. The origin of the island's name lies in the legend that the island is in the realm of Hindu deity Baladewa. The name Madura itself is derived from the word "Mathura" - a word in Indian-origin language Sanskrit for the native home of Baladewa "Baladeva". The corrupted form of Sanskrit word Mathura became the Madura.

History
In 1624, Sultan Agung of Mataram conquered Madura, and the island's government was brought under the Cakraningrats, a single princely line. The Cakraningrat family opposed Central Javanese rule and often conquered large parts of Mataram.

Following the First Javanese War of Succession between Amangkurat III and his uncle, Pangeran Puger, the Dutch gained control of the eastern half of Madura in 1705. Dutch recognition of Puger was influenced by the lord of West Madura, Cakraningrat II who is thought to have supported Puger's claims in the hope that a new war in central Java would provide the Madurese with a chance to interfere. However, while Amangkurat was arrested and exiled to Ceylon, Puger took the title of Pakubuwono I and signed a treaty with the Dutch that granted them, East Madura.

The Cakraningrats agreed to help the Dutch quash the 1740 rebellion in Central Java after the Chinese massacre in 1740. In a 1743 treaty with the Dutch, Pakubuwono I ceded the full sovereignty of Madura to the Dutch, which was contested by Cakraningrat IV. Cakraningrat fled to Banjarmasin, took refuge with the British, was robbed and betrayed by the sultan, and captured by the Dutch and exiled to the Cape of Good Hope.

The Dutch continued Madura's administrative divisions of four states each with their own regent. The island was initially important as a source of colonial troops and in the second half of the nineteenth century it became the main source of salt for Dutch-controlled territories in the archipelago. The Dutch gradually sidelined the Sultan and took over direct control of the entire island in the 1880s, governing it as the Madoera Residency.

Geography
Madura Island is a relatively flat topography and there is no significant difference in elevation, which makes Madura a badland. Geologically, Madura is part of the northern limestone mountains of Java. The limestone hills in Madura are lower, rougher, and rounder than the hills in northern Java.

Demography
Madura (including its offshore islands) has a population of about four million, most of whom are ethnically Madurese. The main language of Madura is Madurese, one of a family of Austronesian languages, which is also spoken in part of eastern Java and on many of the 66 outlying islands.

The Madurese are a large ethnic population in Indonesia, numbering around 7 million inhabitants. They come from the island of Madura as well as surrounding islands, such as Gili Raja, Sapudi, Raas, and the Kangean Islands. In addition, many Madurese live in the eastern part of East Java, commonly called the "Horseshoe", from Pasuruan to the north of Banyuwangi. Madurese are found in Situbondo and Bondowoso, and east of Probolinggo, Jember, and a few at most who speak Javanese, including North Surabaya, as well as some of Malang.

Madura has a Sunni Muslim majority and a large Shia minority. However, since 2012, interfaith discord has escalated into violence, with many Shia villages around the city of Sampang being attacked and the population fleeing their homes for government refugee centers. The United Nations Office for the Coordination of Humanitarian Affairs has provided details of such attacks in 2013.

Administrative divisions 
Madura Island is part of East Java province and is divided into the following four regencies, listed from west to east: 

Note: Sumenep Regency, besides including the eastern quarter of Madura Island, also includes many offshore islands - notably the Kangean Islands (648.56 km2) to the east of Madura, the smaller Sapudi Islands (167.38 km2) lying between Madura and the Kangean Islands, and Talango Island (50.27 km2) closer to Madura; it also includes the small Masalembu Islands (40.85 km2) to the north (between Madura and Kalimantan) and the Giligenteng Islands (30.32 km2) to the southeast of Madura. The mainland (i.e. the area on Madura Island itself) covers 1,156.21 km2 (with 789,476 inhabitants in 2020) consisting of 18 districts, while the various islands are 937.38 km2 in area (with 334,960 people in 2020), comprising 9 districts, with 128 islands, 46 inhabited.

Economy

On the whole, Madura is one of the poorest regions of the East Java province. Unlike Java, the soil is not fertile enough to make it a major agricultural producer. Limited economic opportunities have led to chronic unemployment and poverty. These factors have led to long-term emigration from the island, such that most ethnically Madurese people do not now live on Madura. People from Madura were some of the most numerous participants in government transmigration programs, moving to other parts of Indonesia.

Subsistence agriculture is a mainstay of the economy. Maize is a key subsistence crop, on the island's many small landholdings. Cattle-raising is also a critical part of the agricultural economy, providing extra income to peasant farmer families, in addition to being the basis for Madura's famous bull-racing competitions. Small-scale fishing is also important to the subsistence economy.

Among export industries, tobacco farming is a major contributor to the island's economy. Madura's soil, while unable to support many food crops, helps make the island an important producer of tobacco and cloves for the domestic kretek (clove cigarette) industry. Since the Dutch era, the island has also been a major producer and exporter of salt.

Bangkalan, on the western end of the island, has industrialized substantially since the 1980s. This region is within a short ferry ride of Surabaya, Indonesia's second-largest city, and hence has gained a role as a suburb for commuters to Surabaya, and as a location for industry and services that need to be near the city.

The Surabaya-Madura (Suramadu) Bridge, opened in 2009, is expected to further increase the Bangkalan area's interaction with the regional economy.

Climate
Almost all parts of Madura are lowlands and closer to equator, which make the island is warmer and drier than the mainland of East Java.

According to Köppen-Geiger climate classification, the climate of coastal Madura is tropical savannah (Aw).

According to Köppen-Geiger climate classification, the climate of inland Madura is tropical savannah (Aw).

Culture

Bull racing

Madura is famous for its bull-racing competition (called karapan sapi), where a jockey, usually a young boy, rides a simple wooden sled pulled by a pair of bulls over a course of about 100 meters in ten to fifteen seconds.

Music and theatre
Several forms of music and theatre are popular on Madura, particularly among poorer people for whom they provide an inexpensive form of entertainment and community-building. The topeng theatre, which involves masked performances of classic stories such as the Ramayana and Mahabharata, is the Madurese performance artist best known outside the island, due to its role as a representative Madurese art form at exhibitions of regional cultures from all over Indonesia. However, performances of it are rare on Madura and are generally restricted to entertainment at large official functions. The less formal loddrok theatre, where performers do not wear masks and perform a wider range of themes, is more popular on the island.

The gamelan orchestra, best known as a classical Javanese instrument, is also played on Madura, where several of the former royal courts, such as at Bangkalan and Sumenep, possess elaborate gamelans. Tongtong music, more exclusive to Madura, is played on several wooden or bamboo drums, and often accompanies bull-racing competitions.

Vessels
The Madurese are considered to be excellent sailors. Madurese vessels loaded with cargoes of wood from other islands, like Borneo, used to ply their trade between Indonesia and Singapore. Traditional vessels of Madura include the golekan, leti leti (or leteh-leteh), lis-alis, and janggolan.

References

Bibliography
 
 Bouvier, Hélène (1994) La matière des émotions. Les arts du temps et du spectacle dans la société madouraise (Indonésie). Publications de l'École Française d'Extrême-Orient, vol. 172. Paris : EFEO. .
 Farjon, I.(1980) Madura and surrounding islands : an annotated bibliography, 1860-1942 The Hague: M. Nijhoff. Bibliographical series (Koninklijk Instituut voor Taal-, Land- en Volkenkunde (Netherlands)) ; 9.
 Kees van Dijk, Huub de Jonge, and Elly Touwen-Bouswsma, eds. (1995). Across Madura Strait: the dynamics of an insular society. Leiden: KITLV Press. .
 
 Smith, Glenn (1995) Time Allocation Among the Madurese of Gedang-Gedang. Cross-Cultural Studies in Time Allocation, Volume XIII. New Haven, Connecticut: Human Relations Area Files Press.
 Smith, Glenn (2002) Bibliography of Madura (including Bawean, Sapudi and Kangean).

External links
 
 

Sanskrit-language names
 
Greater Sunda Islands
Islands of Indonesia
Populated places in Indonesia